Julius Leopold Bernhard Exter (20 September 1863, Ludwigshafen - 16 October 1939, Übersee) was a German painter and sculptor. His work consists mostly of landscapes and portraits.

Biography 
He was born to a family of merchants. His brother was architect August Exter. He began his education in Mannheim. In 1881, he enrolled at the Academy of Fine Arts, Munich, where he befriended Franz von Stuck, who introduced him to painting en plein aire.

In 1898, he married the pianist and painter, Judith Anna Köhler (1868-1952); daughter of the Darmstadt art publisher, Karl Christian Köhler. Two of their children became artists;  Judith (1900-1975, painter and sculptor) and Karl (1902-1982, painter and stage designer). They were divorced in 1917.

In 1892, he became one of the co-founders of the Munich Secession. In 1902, he purchased a farm in Chiemsee, where he opened a studio and painting school. That same year, he was appointed Titular Professor and became an honorary member of the Munich Academy. Later, he became associated with Franz Marc and Der Blaue Reiter. After his divorce, he returned to Munich. Among his best-known students were the sculptor, and Karl Friedrich Lippmann.

He died at his home in 1939, of heart failure. His daughter Judith donated his estate to the State of Bavaria in return for a life annuity. The home is now a museum and gallery. His works may also be seen at the Augustinian monastery in Herrenchiemsee.

Selected paintings

Sources 
 Elmar D. Schmid: Julius Exter, 1883-1939. Unbekannte Werke aus dem Nachlass seiner Schülerin Olga Fritz-Zetter., Bayerische Schlösserverwaltung, 
 Elmar D. Schmid: Julius Exter. Aufbruch in die Moderne. Klinkhardt & Biermann, 2000 .
 Elmar D. Schmid: Julius Exter. Freilichtmalerei. Beuroner Kunstverlag, 2005 .
 Historisches Museum der Pfalz Speyer, Julius Exter (1863–1939). (exhibition catalog), Speyer, 2006 .

External links 

 
 "Julius Exter Art Gallery in the Prelacy Tract" @ Bayerische Schlösserverwaltung
 "Julius Exter's House and Garden" @  Bayerische Schlösserverwaltung
 Julius Exter (1863-1939) @ Art-Perfect
 ArtNet: More works by Exter.

1863 births
1939 deaths
19th-century German painters
19th-century German male artists
German male painters
20th-century German painters
20th-century German male artists
Art Nouveau painters
People from Ludwigshafen